Pavlo Andriyovych Kravtsov (born 19 January 2000) is a Ukrainian professional footballer who plays as a goalkeeper for Mariupol in the Ukrainian First League.

Career
Kravtsov is a product of the Shakhtar Donetsk and Mariupol academies.

From August 2017 he played for Mariupol in the Ukrainian Premier League Reserves and Under 19 during four seasons. In July 2019 he was promoted to the main squad to play in the Ukrainian Premier League. Kravtsov made his debut in the Ukrainian Premier League for Mariupol as a start squad player on 9 May 2021, playing in a winning home match against Desna Chernihiv.

References

External links
 
 

2000 births
Living people
Place of birth missing (living people)
Ukrainian footballers
Association football goalkeepers
FC Mariupol players
FC Yarud Mariupol players
Ukrainian Premier League players
Ukrainian First League players
Ukrainian Second League players